John Matthew Shanks (born December 18, 1961) is an American songwriter, record producer and guitarist.

Early life and education
John Matthew Shanks was born in New York City. Shanks moved to Los Angeles when he was 17 years old. He was in a band called Line One with jazz saxophonist Boney James.

Career
Shanks began playing in Melissa Etheridge's band in 1988 and toured with her for several years. Shanks enjoyed his first writing success in the early 1990s with tracks for Bonnie Raitt, Joe Cocker and Tuck & Patti. He also landed his first publishing deal.

Shanks reunited with Etheridge in 1995 when he collaborated with her on songs for Your Little Secret.  He worked with her for several years and co-produced her subsequent album, Breakdown, in 1999.  Breakdown received four Grammy nominations, including Best Rock Song and Best Rock Album.

In 2001, Shanks produced several tracks for the Stevie Nicks album Trouble in Shangri-La and co-wrote the first single, "Every Day", with Damon Johnson.

In January 2001, Shanks began working with Michelle Branch. Together, they wrote four songs for the hit album The Spirit Room, including the first single, "Everywhere". He also produced the album. In the fall of the same year, Shanks co-wrote Sheryl Crow's single, "Steve McQueen".

Shanks started working with Take That in 2005, on their comeback album Beautiful World, and he also produced their next album The Circus in 2008.

Shanks has also produced or written for other projects with Carlos Santana, Celine Dion, Sting, The Corrs, Chris Isaak, Hilary Duff, Keith Urban, and Alanis Morissette. He produced Ashlee Simpson's hit 2004 album Autobiography and is credited with co-writing ten of the album's 12 songs with Simpson. On seven of those, Kara DioGuardi is also credited. That same year, Shanks produced three songs for Kelly Clarkson's hit album Breakaway, including the title track "Breakaway", and worked with Anastacia on two songs for her self-titled album, including the single "Welcome To My Truth".

Shanks won the Grammy Award for Producer of the Year, Non-Classical in 2005 for his work on Autobiography, the Kelly Clarkson song "Breakaway", Hilary Duff's "Fly", Robbie Robertson's "Shine Your Light" and Alanis Morissette's album So-Called Chaos. Clive Davis described Shanks as “the father of that guitar-driven kind of pop sound”, as his work with Branch, Clarkson, Duff and Simpson employed many acoustic guitars in contrast to the synthesizer-heavy sound of the pop music of the period.

In 2005, Shanks regrouped with Ashlee Simpson, producing her second album, I Am Me, and co-writing all of its eleven songs with Simpson and DioGuardi. Shanks also worked on two major albums of 2005, the Backstreet Boys' Never Gone and Bon Jovi's ninth album, Have a Nice Day. In 2007, Shanks also worked to produce the Bon Jovi's tenth album, Lost Highway, and in 2009 he also worked and produced on Bon Jovi's eleventh album, The Circle..

In 2010 and 2011, Shanks collaborated with Irish vocal group Westlife with their albums Gravity and Greatest Hits where it charted at the top of UK and Irish Albums Charts. He also produced (with Steve Robson), Everybody Hurts a charity single for Helping Haiti.

In January 2011, Shanks stated that he began work with rock band Van Halen on its first album with original lead singer David Lee Roth since the landmark LP 1984 (1984). Released in February 2012, Van Halen's A Different Kind of Truth debuted at #2 in the United States, and in the Top 10 on five continents. In 2013, Shanks produced Bon Jovi's twelfth album, What About Now.

In 2014, he produced Anthony Jasmin's EP Stick Together and also worked on Take That's album III. In 2015, Shanks with Jon Bon Jovi produced Bon Jovi's compilation album Burning Bridges and also performed as lead guitarist for the entire album.

Shanks produced Bon Jovi's fourteenth album, This House Is Not for Sale, and became the touring rhythm guitarist for Bon Jovi in 2016 to support the band's This House Is Not for Sale Tour.

Personal life
Shanks has been married to Colleen Coffey since September 1994.

Songwriting discography
Safe by Westlife
Closer by Westlife
Tell Me It's Love by Westlife
I Get Weak by Westlife
No One's Gonna Sleep Tonight by Westlife
Difference in Me by Westlife
Too Hard To Say Goodbye by Westlife
Lighthouse by Westlife
Beautiful World by Westlife
Over and Out by Westlife
Wide Open by Westlife
Poet's Heart by Westlife
Portrait by Cardiknox
White Light by The Corrs
Do It All for Love by Take That
Flaws by Take That
Get Ready for It by Take That
I Like It by Take That
Almost Home by Alex & Sierra
Here We Go by Alex & Sierra
Since I Saw You Last by Gary Barlow
Chapman Square by Lawson
Feels Like Home by Sheryl Crow
"Real Gone" by Sheryl Crow 
Magnetic by Goo Goo Dolls
What About Now by Bon Jovi
Child of the Universe by Delta Goodrem
Every Day by Stevie Nicks
Somebody's Me by Enrique Iglesias
Somebody Like You by Keith Urban

Producer discography
Love Thy Will Be Done by Delta Goodrem
If the World Turned Upside Down by Goo Goo Dolls
Beautiful Day by Jon Bon Jovi
The Spirit Indestructible by Nelly Furtado
A Different Kind of Truth by Van Halen
Gravity by Westlife
Greatest Hits by Westlife
Everybody Hurts by Various Artists
Daydream by Katherine Jenkins
Tell me I'm Not Dreaming by Katherine Jenkins
Gravity by Katherine Jenkins incorrect
Can't Make This Over by Pixie Lott
Fearless Love by Melissa Etheridge
So-Called Chaos by Alanis Morissette
Can't Be Tamed by Miley Cyrus
Real Gone by Sheryl Crow
LIberté by The Doobie Brothers

Collaborations 
 Well... - Katey Sagal (1994)
 Your Little Secret - Melissa Etheridge (1995)
 Love and Money - Eddie Money (1995)
 Head Over Heels - Paula Abdul (1995)
 When We Were the New Boys - Rod Stewart (1998)
 Screamin' for My Supper - Beth Hart (1999)
 Breakdown - Melissa Etheridge (1999)
 Trouble in Shangri-La - Stevie Nicks (2001)
 The Spirit Room - Michelle Branch (2001)
 Respect Yourself - Joe Cocker (2002)
 C'mon, C'mon - Sheryl Crow (2002)
 Hotel Paper - Michelle Branch (2003)
 One Heart - Céline Dion (2003)
 Blue Skies - Diana DeGarmo (2004)
 Breakaway - Kelly Clarkson (2004)
 So-Called Chaos - Alanis Morissette (2004)
 Lucky - Melissa Etheridge (2004)
 Anastacia - Anastacia (2004)
 Wildflower - Sheryl Crow (2005)
 Still the Same... Great Rock Classics of Our Time - Rod Stewart (2006)
 The Great Escape - Ilse DeLange (2006)
 Right Where You Want Me - Jesse McCartney (2006)
 Delta - Delta Goodrem (2007)
 Taking Chances - Céline Dion (2007)
 Songs for You, Truths for Me - James Morrison (2008)
 Pebble to a Pearl - Nikka Costa (2008)
 Everything Comes and Goes - Michelle Branch (2010)
 Fearless Love - Melissa Etheridge (2010)
 Child of the Universe - Delta Goodrem (2012)
 The Spirit Indestructible - Nelly Furtado (2012)
 Since I Saw You Last - Gary Barlow (2013)
 Something Worth Saving - Gavin DeGraw (2016)
 Walls - Barbra Streisand (2018)
 The Medicine Show - Melissa Etheridge (2019)
 Soul - Elisa (2019)
 Liberté by The Doobie Brothers (2021)  - Guitars, dobro, bass, synths, keyboards, piano, organ, drum programming.

References

External links
Official Web site of John Shanks
List of John Shanks' work with various artists

1964 births
American rock guitarists
American male guitarists
Record producers from New York (state)
Songwriters from New York (state)
Living people
Grammy Award winners
Musicians Institute alumni
Guitarists from New York (state)
20th-century American guitarists
20th-century American male musicians
American male songwriters